The Cambridge line runs from Cambridge junction north of Hitchin on the East Coast Main Line to Shepreth Branch Junction south of Cambridge on the West Anglia Main Line and forms part of the route between London King's Cross and East Anglia. The line is part of the Network Rail Strategic Route 5, SRS 05.05 and is classified as a London and South East Commuter line.

History

Plans for a line between Hitchin and Royston were placed before Parliament in 1846 by the Royston and Hitchin Railway.
 The line was opened in 1851 then extended to Cambridge by the Eastern Counties Railway although this was resisted by the company already operating a service from  via the West Anglia Main Line. The line was then leased by the Great Northern Railway
in 1850 and subsequently purchased in 1898
In 2002, a train travelling from King's Cross to King's Lynn, via Cambridge, crashed at Potter's Bar, shortly before set to join the Cambridge line, killing seven.

The extension of electrification through to Cambridge was completed in 1988 under Network SouthEast and the track improved to increase speed. Occasional services are run by 12-car trains

allowing them to stop only at Royston & Letchworth Garden City where the platform is long enough to accommodate them. The platform extension at Letchworth Garden City was completed in December 2011. The Down platforms at Shepreth and Foxton were extended in 2017 to allow 8-car trains to stop without blocking the level crossings.

The flat junction at  has always been an issue with conflicting train movements, but the Hitchin flyover to the north of the existing junction was opened in 2013 to carry north-bound services over the East Coast Main Line.

Services
Services on the line are run by both Thameslink and Great Northern as part of their Great Northern Route.
A mix of Express, Fast and Stopping services are provided on the line including services through Central London to and from Brighton.

An alternative route via the West Anglia Main Line links  to  now provides mainly stopping services though some peak hour trains stop only at Tottenham Hale and Audley End.

Infrastructure
The line is double track throughout. Traction current is supplied at 25 kV AC using overhead line equipment overseen by York Electrical Control Room, with Neutral Sections at Cambridge junction, Litlington and Shepreth Branch Junction. It has a loading gauge of W8 and a maximum line speed of 90 mph.

Route boundary and signalling
Just under a mile to the east of Royston station lies the boundary between the Network Rail London North Eastern Route and Anglia Route. The signalling system for the whole Cambridge line is Track Circuit block, with all main signals being multiple-aspect colour light signals.

Stations
In order from southwest to north.

Passenger volume
These are the passenger usage statistics on the National Rail network from the year beginning April 2002 to the year beginning April 2010. Comparing both years, Cambridge has increased by nearly 51%, Foxton by 57%, Shepreth by 99%, Meldreth by 41% although it has declined in recent years until this point, Royston increased by 28%, Ashwell and Morden by 30%, Baldock by 50%, Letchworth Garden City by 33% and Hitchin by 44%.

References

Railway lines in the East of England
Hitchin
Rail transport in Hertfordshire
Rail transport in Cambridge
Rail transport in Cambridgeshire